James Randall may refer to:

 James Ryder Randall (1839–1908), American journalist and poet
 James G. Randall (1881–1953), American historian
 James Leslie Randall (1828–1922), English bishop
 James K. Randall (1929–2014), American composer
 James Randall (murderer) (born 1954), American criminal
James Randall (priest), English priest
 Jimmy Randall (1904–?), English professional footballer
 James "Sap" Randall (born 1960), American baseball player and coach

See also
James Randi (1928–2020), American stage magician and scientific sceptic